Neanura magna, the bear-bodied springtail, is a species of springtail in the family Neanuridae.

References

Neanuridae
Articles created by Qbugbot
Animals described in 1893